Kellian Van Rensalear Whaley (May 6, 1821 – May 20, 1876) was a nineteenth-century lumberman and congressman from Virginia before the American Civil War and West Virginia after the state's creation. During the Civil War, Whaley was major of the 9th West Virginia Volunteer Infantry and captured during a Confederate raid, but escaped his captors.

Early life

Whaley was born in Utica, New York on May 6, 1821. He married Louisa Mary Perdue (1828-1908), who survived him. Their sons included Charles Monroe Whaley (1850-1918), Warren Clayton Whaley (1852-1931), Harlan L. Whaley (1854-1936), Fulton Morse Whaley (1856-1907), Carlisle Landers Whaley (1859-1944) and James Whaley (b. 1859), as well as daughters Mary J. Whaley Fry (1847-1925) and Ida Belle Whaley Allen (1861-1946).

U.S. Congress

Whaley worked in Point Pleasant, Virginia (now West Virginia) in the lumber business until the Civil War. Whaley was elected a Unionist to the United States House of Representatives in 1860, representing Virginia's 12th congressional district and served from 1861 to 1863. He lost his seat due to Virginia's secession from the Union.

Civil War
During the Civil War, Whaley recruited men for the Union Army. Commissioned as major of the 9th West Virginia Volunteer Infantry Regiment, Whaley was captured by Confederate forces under the command of General Albert Gallatin Jenkins on November 10, 1861, during a Confederate raid on the town of Guyandotte, West Virginia (now a neighborhood of Huntington, West Virginia). While being marched up the Guyandotte River, Major Whaley escaped his captors at Chapmanville in Logan County and made his way to safety by traveling up Big Harts Creek in Lincoln and Logan counties to Queens Ridge in Wayne County, West Virginia.

U.S. Congressman
After creation of the new state of West Virginia, Whaley won election from West Virginia's 3rd congressional district as an Unconditional Unionist, serving from 1863 to 1867. From 1863 to 1865, he was chairman of the Committee on Invalid Pensions. Whaley was a delegate to the Republican National Convention in 1864. He was chairman of the Committee on Revolutionary Claims from 1865 to 1867. He served on the Congressional committee that accompanied the body of President Abraham Lincoln on the funeral train as it was returned from Washington to Springfield. He did not seek reelection in 1866, and was replaced by fellow Republican Daniel Polsley. In 1868, he served as collector of customs at Brazos de Santiago, Texas.

Death and legacy
Whaley died in Point Pleasant, West Virginia on May 20, 1876 and was interred in Lone Oak Cemetery in Point Pleasant.

See also

United States congressional delegations from West Virginia

References

1821 births
1876 deaths
Politicians from Utica, New York
Unionist Party members of the United States House of Representatives from Virginia
Unconditional Union Party members of the United States House of Representatives from West Virginia
People from Point Pleasant, West Virginia
People of Virginia in the American Civil War
People of West Virginia in the American Civil War
Union Army officers
Military personnel from West Virginia
Customs officers
19th-century American politicians
Military personnel from Utica, New York
Virginia Unionists
West Virginia Unconditional Unionists
Members of the United States House of Representatives from West Virginia
Members of the United States House of Representatives from Virginia